Japanese in Korea are Japanese people who work and live on the Korean Peninsula in one of the two countries:
 Japanese people in North Korea
 Japanese people in South Korea

Korean people of Japanese descent
Japanese diaspora in Asia
Japan–Korea relations